A cobbled street or cobblestone road, is a street or road paved with cobblestones.

There are many historic streets that are cobbled. In the United States, several of these are recognized in the National Register of Historic Places.

List
The following is a list of streets and roads which are famed or notable for being paved with cobbles (natural stone), setts (cut stone), artificial pavers (i.e. concrete or brick), or similar masonry works (natural, cut, or artificial).

In Belgium

In France

In the United States

Notes

References

See also
 Cobblestone
 List of cobblestone buildings
 Cobbled classics

Cobblestone roads
Cobblestone streets
 Streets
 List